Wasbir Hussain is an Indian journalist and political commentator specializing in peace, security and development in Northeast India.

Career 
Beginning his career as a journalist in 1984, Hussain covered Northeast India, Bangladesh and Bhutan for major Indian newspapers and journals, including The Hindu, The Telegraph, The Asian Age, India Today Group Online, and Outlook. He was also Editor of The Northeast Daily, an English daily from Guwahati, and was Consulting Editor of The Sentinel, a premier English daily from Assam. In 1996, Hussain received the Sanskriti Foundation National Award for excellence in journalism. He had also been Consulting Editor of Times Now TV (2009-2016).

Hussain currently writes regularly for The Asian Age, The Associated Press and a host of other newspapers and journals. Besides, his writings on security issues concerning India's Northeast and its surrounding foreign neighbours appear regularly in strategic affairs think tanks and journals. His major research work has been on the issues of insurgency and trans-national insurgency in Northeast India, comparative study of ethnic insurrections in Northeast India and the Maoist rebellion in Chhattisgarh, Jharkhand and Andhra Pradesh, the problem of illegal migration and demographic ‘invasion’ in Northeast India, ethno-nationalism, and India’s Act East Policy. He has also been looking closely on strategic and political developments in Myanmar and China and has been writing opinion pieces on these issues.

One of the founders of the research and policy think tank, the Centre for Development and Peace Studies, he is currently its executive director. Hussain was twice nominated Member of India's National Security Advisory Board (2006–2008 and 2010–2012). He is currently the Editor-in-Chief of North East Live, northeastern India's first satellite English News Channel, with headquarters in Guwahati. The channel is the latest venture of Pride East Entertainments Pvt Ltd, the region's largest media group. Hussain hosts a debate show on the Channel titled 'Northeast Tonight with Wasbir Hussain, telecast every Saturday at 8 pm. The program involves discussion on current trending topics in Northeast India. He also hosts a popular weekly English talk show 'Talk Time with Wasbir Hussain' on News Live, a Group channel. In 2017, Hussain and two of his associates established the region's first state-of-the-art Television Media Institute at Guwahati called Turning Point Institute of Media & Creative Skills.

Bibliography
Some of the books Hussain has authored or edited touches on issues of communal harmony and has succeeded in highlighting the devastating impact of violence and insurgency. His books include:
Homemakers Without The Men: Assam's Widows Of Violence (Indialog Publications, New Delhi, 2006), 
Child Victims of Ethnic Violence (Bulwark Books & Institute for Conflict management, New Delhi, 2004), 
Order in Chaos: Essays on Conflict in India's Northeast and the Road to Peace in South Asia (Spectrum Publications, Guwahati / New Delhi, 2006), 
Positive in Rhino Land: Battle against HIV/AIDS in Assam (Wordweaves India, Guwahati, 2008),
Peace Tools & Conflict Nuances in India's Northeast (Wordweaves India, Guwahati, 2010), 
Tarun Gogoi: The Inside Story of a Blunt Politician (Wordweaves India, Guwahati, 2010), 
Chord of Harmony: Sattras and Dargahs of Assam (Wordweaves India, Guwahati, 2010, co-authored with Bhaskar Jyoti Mahanta), 
Kamrup: The Mirror of Assam's Past and Present (Wordweaves India, Guwahati, 2013, co-edited with Ashutosh Agnihotri).
Northeast India: The Maoist Spread (Wordweaves India, Guwahati, 2014),
Shared Rivers in South Asia: Challenges and Prospects in Lower Riparian States (Wordweaves India, Guwahati, 2015),
Assamese Cinema: 80 Years (Wordweaves India, Guwahati, 2015, co-edited with Maini Mahanta),
Power Play in Assam Hills: Aspirations, Developments & Politics in Dima Hasao (Wordweaves India, Guwahati, 2017)

References

External links

Living people
Indian political journalists
Journalists from Assam
Indian male journalists
Year of birth missing (living people)
21st-century Indian male writers
21st-century Indian journalists